Skongenes Lighthouse is a coastal lighthouse located in Kinn Municipality in Vestland county, Norway.  The lighthouse is located on the northern tip of the island of Vågsøy.

History
It was first lit in 1870 and automated in 1985. The lighthouse is owned by the Norwegian Coastal Administration, and is run as tourist cabin by Ytre Nordfjord Turlag.

There is a -story wood keeper's house located nearby. The keeper's house is available for overnight accommodations, but the tower is closed to the public.

See also

 List of lighthouses in Norway
 Lighthouses in Norway

References

External links
 Norsk Fyrhistorisk Forening 
 Picture of Skongenes Lighthouse

Lighthouses completed in 1870
Lighthouses in Vestland
Tourist huts in Norway
Kinn